Daulat Pur Dewaria is a Gram Panchayat in Hajipur,  Vaishali District, Bihar, India.

Geography
This panchayat is located at

Panchayat office

Nearest city or town
Hajipur (Distance 8 km)

Nearest major road highway or river
NH 77 (National highway 77)

compass

Villages in panchayat
There are  villages in this panchayat

References

Gram panchayats in Bihar
Villages in Vaishali district
Vaishali district
Hajipur